The Funen Life Regiment was an infantry regiment of the Royal Danish Army. On 1 November 1991 it was merged with the King's Jutlandic Regiment of Foot, into Slesvigske Fodregiment.

History
It was one of the oldest regiments in the Danish army and could trace its history back to 1614 when it was raised under the name Fynske Fenle Knægte af Jydske Regiment Landsfolk. The Regiment participated in all Danish wars since 1625, including Torstenson War (1643–1645) Northern Wars (1658–1660), Scanian War (1675–1679), Great Northern War (1700), Great Northern War (1709–1720), Slaget på Reden (1801), Gunboat War (1807–1814), First Schleswig War (1848–1850) and Second Schleswig War (1864). It was furthermore in foreign war service during 1689–1714. The regimental flag has the battle honours Lutter am Barenberg 1626, Wismar 1675, Christianstad 1677–78, Stralsund 1715, Dybbøl 1848, Isted 1850 and Dybbøl 1864.

Organisation
Disband units
 1st battalion (I/FLR), Founded 1961, Disband 1990. Mechanized Infantry Battalion
  Staff Company
  1st Armored Infantry Company
  2nd Armored Infantry Company
  4th Motorised Infantry Company
 2nd battalion (II/FLR), Founded 1961, Disband 1990. Infantry Battalion.
  Staff Company
  1st Motorised Infantry Company
  2nd Motorised Infantry Company
  3rd Motorised Infantry Company
 3rd battalion (III/FLR), Founded 1961, Disband 1990. Infantry Battalion.
  Staff Company
  1st Infantry Company
  2nd Infantry Company
  3rd Infantry Company 
 4th battalion (IV/FLR), Founded 1961, Disband 1990. Motorised Infantry Battalion.
  Staff Company
  1st Motorised Infantry Company
  2nd Motorised Infantry Company
  3rd Motorised Infantry Company  
  4th Tank Destroyer Squadron

Names of the regiment

Standards

References

 Lærebog for Hærens Menige, Hærkommandoen, marts 1960

Danish Army regiments
1614 establishments in Denmark
Military units and formations established in 1614
Military units and formations disestablished in 1991